The Americano is a 1955 American Western film directed by William Castle and starring Glenn Ford.

Plot
Texas rancher Sam Dent (Glenn Ford) takes a small herd of three Brahman bulls to Brazil, where he has sold them for a small fortune. There, he finds himself in the middle of a range war, as well as in love. Following this, he must find out who are his friends and who are his enemies.

Cast
 Glenn Ford as Sam Dent
 Frank Lovejoy as  Bento Hermany
 Cesar Romero as Manuel Silvera / "El Gato" / Etc.
 Ursula Thiess as Marianna
 Abbe Lane as Teresa
 Rodolfo Hoyos Jr. as Cristino
 Salvador Baguez as Captain Gonzalez
 Tom Powers as Jim Rogers 
 Dan White as Barney Dent
 Frank Marlowe as Captain of Ship
 George Navarro as Tuba Masero 
 Nyra Monsour as Tuba's Sister

Production
The Americano began filming in July 1953 in São Paulo, Brazil. Budd Boetticher was initially the director and Clifford Stine the cinematographer. Due to bad weather in Brazil, production stopped in September 1953. Ford refused to return to film and was sued for $1.75 million for breach of contract. Filming recommenced in June 1954 with Boetticher replaced by William Castle and Stine replaced by William Snyder. Abbe Lane's musical number was supervised by her husband, Xavier Cugat.

See also
List of American films of 1955

References

External links
 
 
Videohound's Golden Movie Retriever 2005 by Jim Craddock

1955 films
1955 Western (genre) films
American Western (genre) films
Films scored by Roy Webb
Films directed by William Castle
Films set in Brazil
RKO Pictures films
1950s English-language films
1950s American films